Ecbathyriontidae is a family of crustaceans belonging to the order Siphonostomatoida.

Genera:
 Bathygordion Ivanenko & Martinez Arbizu, 2018
 Ecbathyrion Humes, 1987

References

Siphonostomatoida